"Girls & Boys" is a song by British rock band Blur, released in March 1994 as the lead single from the group's third album, Parklife (1994). Charting at number five on the UK Singles Chart, "Girls & Boys" was Blur's first top 5 hit and their most successful single until "Country House" reached number one the following year. The single surpassed their previous commercial peak "There's No Other Way" by three spots on the UK Singles Chart, and saw the group achieve greater worldwide success. In the US, the track reached number 59 on the Billboard Hot 100 singles chart, becoming the band's second single to hit the chart after "There's No Other Way". It also reached number four on the Billboard Modern Rock songs chart. 

"Girls & Boys" was named single of the year by NME and Melody Maker. It was also nominated for best song at the MTV Europe Music Awards.

Composition

Damon Albarn was inspired to write the song while on holiday in Magaluf, Spain, with then-girlfriend Justine Frischmann, lead singer of Elastica. According to Albarn, the city had "really tacky Essex nightclubs" and a rampant sexual scene among visitors, with  "All these blokes and all these girls meeting at the watering hole and then just copulating. There's no morality involved, I'm not saying it should or shouldn't happen." The music has a convergence of various pop and dance styles, summed up by bassist Alex James as "Disco drums, nasty guitars and Duran Duran bass." Drummer Dave Rowntree admitted he is not on the track, being replaced by a drum machine he programmed. He said it was his favourite song on Blur: The Best Of because he "isn't really in it. It's cool not being in your own song." The vocals were recorded with a demo featuring only the keyboards. This song is written in the key of G minor.

Release
Producer Stephen Street felt that while "Girls & Boys" was not like Blur's previous songs, "I thought it would be Top 5 – it was so downright basic. I felt the way I had when I produced the Smiths: that as long as Morrissey was singing on it, it would be the Smiths. It was the same with Blur: they could put their hands to anything, and it would still sound like Blur." The song indeed reached number five on the UK Singles Chart, Blur's first foray into the top 5. Despite the band having big expectations for the single, guitarist Graham Coxon said "going top five was a bit of a shocker", and Albarn confessed to having his first panic attack shortly after the single entered the charts.

Critical reception
AllMusic editor Stephen Thomas Erlewine described "Girls & Boys" as "undeniably catchy" and "one of the best (songs) Blur ever recorded", praising the band for making the song "feel exactly like Eurotrash", and stating that the chorus was "an absolutely devastating put-down of '90s gender-bending, where even ambi-sexuals didn't know whose fantasy they were fulfilling." Larry Flick from Billboard wrote, "Alternative band takes a detour into clubland with an amusing, word-twisting ditty fleshed out with a trance-like synth energy and a hard, syncopated beat, courtesy of the Pet Shop Boys. Way-hip single's primary selling point is the brain-numbing refrain "girls who want boys like boys to be girls who do boys like they're girls who do girls like they're boys." Try saying that three times fast. A good bet for dancefloor action, track should also get a crack at pop/crossover radio." Troy J. Augusto from Cash Box felt that "this track will light up dance floors first, with top-40 and even some experimental urban radio stations close behind. Not what we've come to expect from this quirky guitar-pop combo, which is part of the appeal here. And don't be surprised if RuPaul records a cover of this tasty gem." Chuck Campbell from Knoxville News Sentinel wrote in his review of Parklife, "That great song, "Girls & Boys", is a twisting, slapping, lusty and instantly satisfying neo-disco track featuring Graham Coxon's teasing guitar and Damon Albarn's endearing vocals." He added, "Those who allow Parklife to continue playing after the conclusion of "Girls & Boys" will be disappointed initially, because nothing else on the album is so acutely infectious."

Steve Hochman from Los Angeles Times praised it as a "delightfully sly single". Pan-European magazine Music & Media viewed it as a "comical pastiche on '80s "new romantics"." Martin Aston from Music Week gave it four out of five, complimenting it as "an irresistibly feisty pop bite and, as such, a probable Top 10 hit." John Kilgo from The Network Forty described it as an "outstanding, infectious" tune. Paul Evans from Rolling Stone felt it is "echoing '80s synth pop". Sylvia Patterson from Smash Hits rated it four out of five, writing, "An organ-grinder of synth pings and guitar perks which sounds just like Elastica (whose singer Damon snogs). It is the sound of Now! (ie 1982) which was a good sound so that's all right. Sort of." Rob Sheffield from Spin described the song as "a scrumptiously sleek Duran-gänger, sounding exactly like the Fab Five circa "Planet Earth" and "Hungry Like the Wolf"." He added, "Over a Eurodisco bass line, vocalist Damon Albarn croons about a beach full of teenagers stewing in their own auto-erotic juices: "Nothing is wasted / Only reproduced / You get nasty blisters / Deep obsession, but we haven't been introduced"." James Hunter from Vibe called it a "brilliant turn on new wave disco that boasts the year's best bent guitars. They bounce all this into a great English, um, blur."

Music video
The accompanying music video for "Girls & Boys" was directed by English singer, songwriter, musician and music video director Kevin Godley. It features Blur performing the song against a bluescreen backdrop of documentary footage of people on Club 18-30 package holidays. Godley branded the video as "Page 3 rubbish", while Blur found it "perfect". The front cover of the single was taken from a pack of Durex condoms.

Legacy
The song is included on two compilations albums: Blur: The Best Of and Midlife: A Beginner's Guide to Blur.

Pet Shop Boys, who provided a remix of the track for the single release, later covered the song during their Discovery tour in 1994. Their remix was also included on the Japanese version of the Parklife album.

Hong Kong pop duo Tat Ming Pair covered it on their 1997 live concert album 萬歲萬歲萬萬歲演唱會.

In 2003, Radiohead frontman Thom Yorke confessed on BBC Radio 1 that he wished he had written the song, jokingly calling Blur "bastards" for writing it first.

In 2007, electronic band Blaqk Audio released a cover of the song as a Hot Topic exclusive bonus track for their debut album CexCells. The song was covered by French singer Mélanie Pain on her 2009 album My Name. American alternative rock band The Get Up Kids performed a version of the song in July 2011 for The A.V. Club A.V. Undercover series. It was also featured in the Wii game Just Dance and on the Xbox 360 Kinect title Dance Central as a downloadable song off Xbox Live.

In 2010, Pitchfork included the song at number 26 on their Top 200 Tracks of the 90s.

"Blurred" by Pianoman features the chorus (sampled from the Pet Shop Boys 12" remix) as its key lyric. The single peaked at number 6 on the UK Singles Chart in 1996.

In 2017, Stopera and Galindo from BuzzFeed remarked the song as "a great reminder of just how brilliant Blur was throughout the '90s."

Track listings
All music composed by Albarn, Coxon, James and Rowntree. All lyrics composed by Albarn, with the exception of "Maggie May" written by Rod Stewart and Martin Quittenton.

7" and Cassette
"Girls & Boys" – 4:20
"Magpie" – 4:15
"People in Europe" – 3:28

CD1
"Girls & Boys" – 4:20
"Magpie" – 4:15 (mistakenly credited as "People in Europe" on the back cover.)
"Anniversary Waltz" – 1:23

CD2
"Girls & Boys" – 4:20
"People in Europe" – 3:28
"Peter Panic" – 4:22

US CD
"Girls & Boys"
"Girls & Boys" (Pet Shop Boys radio edit)
"Girls & Boys" (Pet Shop Boys 12" mix)
"Magpie"
"Peter Panic"
"Maggie May"

US Cassette
"Girls & Boys"
"Girls & Boys" (Pet Shop Boys radio edit)
"Maggie May"

US 12"
"Girls & Boys" (Pet Shop Boys 12" mix)
"Girls & Boys" (album version)
"Girls & Boys" (Pet Shop Boys 7" mix)

Europe CD
"Girls & Boys"
"Girls & Boys" (Pet Shop Boys radio edit)
"Girls & Boys" (Pet Shop Boys 12" mix)
"Magpie"
"Anniversary Waltz"

2012 Brit Awards
"Girls & Boys" (Live from the BRITs) – 4:43
"Song 2" (Live from the BRITs) – 2:15
"Parklife" (featuring Phil Daniels) (Live from the BRITs) – 2:52

Charts

Weekly charts

Year-end charts

Certifications

Vandalism version

"Boys & Girls" was covered by Australian dance band Vandalism and released as a single in 2005.

Track listing
 Australian CD single
 "Boys & Girls" (Radio edit)
 "Boys & Girls" (Ivan Gough And Grant Smillie Remix Radio Edit)
 "Boys & Girls" (Extended Mix)
 "Boys & Girls" (Ivan Gough & Grant Smillie Remix)

Charts

Release history

References

1994 singles
1994 songs
2004 singles
Bisexuality-related songs
Blur (band) songs
British new wave songs
British synth-pop songs
British dance-pop songs
Food Records singles
Music videos directed by Kevin Godley
Songs about casual sex
Songs written by Alex James (musician)
Songs written by Damon Albarn
Songs written by Dave Rowntree
Songs written by Graham Coxon
Vandalism (band) songs